23S rRNA (cytidine2498-2'-O)-methyltransferase (YgdE, rRNA large subunit methyltransferase M, RlmM) is an enzyme with systematic name S-adenosyl-L-methionine:23S rRNA (cytidine2498-2'-O-)-methyltransferase. This enzyme catalyses the following chemical reaction

 S-adenosyl-L-methionine + cytidine2498 in 23S rRNA  S-adenosyl-L-homocysteine + 2'-O-methylcytidine2498 in 23S rRNA

References

External links 
 

EC 2.1.1